Mount Dawson may refer to one of three mountains:

 Mount Dawson (Antarctica), a peak in the Sentinel Range of Antarctica
 Mount Dawson (Canada), the highest summit of the Selkirk Mountains in British Columbia, Canada
 Mount Dawson (New Brunswick), a mountain in New Brunswick, Canada